Service is a 2008 Filipino independent drama film directed by Brillante Mendoza and stars Gina Pareño as the matriarch of the Pineda family who owns a porn cinema in Angeles City. The film competed for the Palme d'Or in the main competition at the 2008 Cannes Film Festival. It is also the first Filipino film to compete at the main competition in Cannes, since Lino Brocka's Bayan Ko: Kapit sa Patalim in 1984.

Plot 
Service is a drama that follows the daily life of the Pineda family in the Philippine city of Angeles. Bigamy, unwanted pregnancy, possible incest and skin diseases are all part of their daily challenges, but the real "star" of the show is an enormous, dilapidated movie theater that is both family business and home. In the past a prestigious place, the theater now features soft core porn and serves as a meeting ground for male & female prostitutes of every conceivable persuasion. The film captures the sordid, decaying atmosphere, interweaving various family drama with the comings and goings of customers, thieves and even a runaway farm animal while enveloping the viewer in a cacophony of city sound, noise and continuous pumping motion.

Cast 
Gina Pareño as Nanay Flor
Jaclyn Jose as Nayda
Julio Diaz as Lando
Kristoffer King as Ronald
Mercedes Cabral as Merly
Coco Martin as Alan
Dan Alvaro as Jerome

Brillante Mendoza recounted how difficult it was to find the actress for the role of Merly, partly because of the scene in which she had to have real penetrative sex on camera: "I couldn't think of a young actress from mainstream movies who can do what the role required, so I held an audition for the role of Merly. I wanted someone who's not interested in becoming a "movie star," I wanted a real artist who can give justice to the role, and I saw that in Mercedes Cabral. The first thing I asked is if she would trust me to shoot this somewhat graphic love scene with Coco. She said it wasn't a problem."

Production
Brillante Mendoza said the scene in which Jewel (played by teenage actress Roxanne Jordan), is naked in front of a mirror, wasn't in the script.

The film was shot in just 12 days.

Release

Box office

Critical response 
Service caused a stir in the Philippines with its loud ambient noise and its graphic depiction of sex and nudity. Submitted to the Movie and Television Review and Classification Board for public exhibition in 2008, the movie survived with two major cuts to sex scenes and was rated an R18.

Such was the advance international buzz of the film that it was invited to compete at the 61st Annual Cannes Film Festival, being the 3rd overall entry from the Philippines (following the films of director Lino Brocka, Jaguar and Bayan Ko: Kapit sa Patalim). Its premiere at the festival was marked by the walking out of several veteran film critics who protested Mendoza's version of "misery porn."

On 30 January 2009, the film premiered in New York. Writing for The New York Times, its chief film critic Manohla Dargis described the film: "The heavenly bodies that populate our films bring their own pleasures ... alighting onscreen as if from a dream. But the bodies in [‘Serbis’], which received little love at the 2008 Cannes, are not heaven-sent, but neither are they puppets in a contrived nightmare. Rather, they lust, sweat, desire and struggle with the ferocious truth." Roger Ebert of the Chicago Sun-Times gave Service two and a half out of four stars, stating that "[i]f you see only one art film this month, this shouldn't be the one. If you see one every week, you might admire it."

Accolades

References

External links 

Film Review: 'Serbis' in Hollywood Reporter
Mixed Reviews of Serbis in Cannes 
New York Times film review accessed on 31 January 2009

2008 drama films
2008 films
Filipino-language films
Films directed by Brillante Mendoza
Philippine drama films
Erotic drama films